Portugal S.A. is a 2004 Portuguese drama film directed by Ruy Guerra. It was entered into the 26th Moscow International Film Festival.

Cast
 Diogo Infante as Jacinto Pereira Lopes
 Cristina Câmara as Fátima Resende
 Henrique Viana as Alexandre Boaventura
 Ana Bustorff as Rosa Pereira Lopes
 Luís Madureira as Father Francisco
 Cristina Carvalhal as Maria Helena
 Cândido Ferreira as Fernando Oliveira
 Maria do Céu Guerra as Mother of Jacinto
 João Reis as João Nuno Menezes
 João Vaz as Pedro Castelo Branco
 F. Pedro Oliveira as Paulo Magalhães

References

External links
 

2004 films
2004 drama films
Portuguese drama films
2000s Portuguese-language films
Films directed by Ruy Guerra